Pajeon is a variety of jeon with scallion as its prominent ingredient, as pa means scallion. It is a Korean dish made from a batter of eggs, wheat flour, rice flour, scallions, and often other ingredients depending on the variety. Beef, pork, kimchi, shellfish, and other seafood are mostly used. If one of these ingredients, such as squid, dominates the jeon, the name will reflect that; ojing'eo jeon (오징어전) is 'squid jeon.

Pajeon is usually recognizable by the highly visible scallions. It is similar to a Chinese scallion pancake in appearance; however, unlike the Chinese dish (but like Western pancakes), it is made from a liquid batter and thus has a lighter texture.

Preparation 
It is made by placing jjokpa scallions parallel on a hot pan with vegetable oil, pan-frying them, then ladling onto them the batter made by mixing wheat flour, water, soybean paste, and sugar. The pancake is turned over when the bottom holds together and is golden-brown. It is usually served with a dipping sauce made of soy sauce.

Type
Some varieties of pajeon, with the shape of scallions preserved as in dongnae pajeon are typical jeon. Some other varieties, with the scallions cut and mixed into the batter, are closer to buchimgae.

Seafood pajeon
In Korean, a seafood pajeon is called haemul pajeon (해물파전). Various seafood are used in the batter and toppings, e.g., oysters, shrimp, squid, clams.

Dongnae pajeon
Dongnae pajeon is named after Dongnaesung (동래성), a former fortress in the Joseon Dynasty and now a district in the city of Busan. Dongnae was a prominent battleground during the Imjin War and legend says the people of Dongnae threw scallions while defeating the invading Japanese soldiers. Dongnae pajeon was made in honor of the victory.

The dish was also presented at the king's table and became popular when the Dongnae market flourished in the Joseon era.

Dongnae pajeon is usually made from a batter of rice flour, glutinous rice flour, eggs, and gochujang. Soft scallions, beef, clams, mussels, oysters, shrimp and other seafood are added.

See also

Jeon
Bindaetteok
Kimchijeon
Gamjajeon
 List of onion dishes

Other countries
Cōngyóubǐng (Chinese) (simplified Chinese: 葱油饼; traditional Chinese: 蔥油餅; pinyin: cōngyóubǐng)
 variant of okonomiyaki (Japanese)
Bánh xèo (Vietnamese)

References

External links

Seafood pajeon recipe
 Dongnae Pajeon Research Group, Dongnae-gu office 
Pancakes of the World, Dressed for Dinner (including video) at New York Times
Pairings: Korean pancake flips for wine at San Francisco Chronicle
Recipe for pajeon at Asia Society

Korean pancakes
Scallion dishes